Juan Carlos "Toto" Lorenzo (27 October 1922 – 14 November 2001) was an Argentine football player and coach. He became an icon for Boca Juniors fans after he coached the club to its first two Copa Libertadores titles.

Biography
In his teens, Lorenzo played for Chacarita Juniors, and made his professional debut in 1940. He was transferred to Boca Juniors in 1945, and after two years he joined Italian side Sampdoria team, where he remained until 1952. His next clubs would be now-defunct French F.C. Nancy, and Atlético Madrid, Rayo Vallecano, and RCD Mallorca, where in 1958 he was coach and player. Then, he quit play but remained as coach.

Lorenzo would be the coach that helped Mallorca to promote to Primera División for the first time in 1960.

Influenced by Argentine-Italian Helenio Herrera and riding the wave of his success in Spain, Lorenzo coached Argentina's San Lorenzo in 1961, and coached the Argentina national team in the 1962 FIFA World Cup. Back to Europe, he coached Lazio to Italian first division, and coached AS Roma in 1964. After coaching again the Argentine team for the 1966 FIFA World Cup, he would then return to Mallorca, then returned Lazio to first division, and won his first Argentine title (of a total of two) with San Lorenzo in 1972.

In 1973 Lorenzo went to Atlético Madrid, who went on to win the league title and lose the 1974 UEFA Champions League final to Bayern Munich. Back in Argentina, he coached recently promoted Unión de Santa Fe in 1975. The next year, he returned to Boca Juniors amid great pressure (rivals River Plate had just won back-to-back titles), and started one of the most successful periods in the history of the club. In his four-year tenure, Lorenzo and Boca took two local and three international titles, including the 1977 Intercontinental Cup (played in 1978).

Lorenzo's Boca was anchored by goalkeeper Hugo Gatti, a longtime Boca fan who fulfilled his dream of playing for Boca, and went on to become the player with most appearances in Argentine football history. In the defense, Vicente Pernía in the right and Alberto Tarantini in the left complemented centrals Francisco Sá and Roberto Mouzo. In the center field, reinforcements such as Jorge Ribolzi and Mario Zanabria played alongside veteran Boca players like Jorge Chino Benítez and Rubén Suñé. The attacking line was based on the speed of Ernesto Mastrángelo and Luis Darío Felman.

After that cycle, Lorenzo coached a number of different clubs with less success, including Racing Club, Argentinos Juniors, San Lorenzo, Vélez Sársfield, Atlanta, and Lazio, to return to Boca Juniors in 1987. But his second stint with Boca was brief, and Lorenzo finally retired from coaching.

Honours

Manager 
Mallorca
 Segunda División: 1959–60

San Lorenzo de Almagro
 Primera División: 1972 Metropolitano, 1972 Nacional

Boca Juniors
 Primera División: 1976 Metropolitano, 1976 Nacional
 Copa Libertadores: 1977, 1978
 Intercontinental Cup: 1977

References

1922 births
2001 deaths
Argentine people of Spanish descent
Association football midfielders
Association football forwards
Argentine footballers
Argentine Primera División players
La Liga players
Atlético Madrid footballers
RCD Mallorca players
Rayo Vallecano players
Boca Juniors footballers
Chacarita Juniors footballers
U.C. Sampdoria players
FC Nancy players
Serie A players
Ligue 1 players
Argentine expatriate footballers
Expatriate footballers in France
Expatriate footballers in Italy
Expatriate footballers in Spain
Argentine football managers
Argentine expatriate football managers
San Lorenzo de Almagro managers
Club Atlético River Plate managers
Unión de Santa Fe managers
Boca Juniors managers
Racing Club de Avellaneda managers
Argentinos Juniors managers
Club Atlético Vélez Sarsfield managers
Club Atlético Atlanta managers
Atlético Madrid managers
RCD Mallorca managers
S.S. Lazio managers
A.S. Roma managers
Serie A managers
Argentina national football team managers
1962 FIFA World Cup managers
1966 FIFA World Cup managers
Footballers from Buenos Aires
La Liga managers
Expatriate football managers in Italy
Expatriate football managers in Spain
Argentine expatriate sportspeople in France
Argentine expatriate sportspeople in Italy
Argentine expatriate sportspeople in Spain
Independiente Santa Fe managers